Populus heterophylla, also known as downy poplar, swamp poplar and swamp cottonwood, is a large deciduous poplar belonging to the Populus genus of the family Salicaceae. This species can grow on sites that have too much water for other native poplars. On the IUCN Red List this species is listed as "least concern".

Description 
Swamp poplar can reach a height 50 to 100 ft at maturity. The trunk and branches are a light to medium grey, with the trunk being coarsely furrowed. The leaves are alternate deciduous that are 4-6 inches long and 3-4 inches across. Mature leaves are medium to dark green on their upper surface and pale green on the lower surface. Petioles are 2-3 inches long and tend to be between pale green or pale yellow. This species is pollinated by wind. This species flowers in April and fruits May-June.

Habitat

Location 
This species is indigenous to warm, temperate regions in North America, although nowhere is it considered abundant. It is found in wet bottomland forests. Swamp cottonwood can be found along the east coast of the United States from Connecticut to Georgia, as well as northwestern Florida and west to Louisiana. It also grows in the Mississippi valley, Ohio and southern Michigan.

Soils and topography 
Populus heterophylla is typically found on heavy clays, but can be found on the edges of swamps (not within). Ideal growth will happen in areas where the water table is near the surface for all but 2-3 months a year.

Climate 
Humid climate is common throughout the range of the swamp poplar. Rainfall varies for this species based on how far north it is found. When found in Indiana the average annual rainfall is about 35 in (890 cm); as opposed to when found in Louisiana average annual rainfall is 59 in (1500 mm). Yearly average temperatures range in the North and South from 50ºF to 70ºF respectively.

Special uses 
There are no special uses or commercial value for this species due to the similarity to Populus deltoides, which grows faster and easier.

References

External links
 USDA Forest Service: Silvics of Trees of North America. Populus heterophylla L. Swamp Cottonwood
 USDA Natural Resources Conservation Service: Plant Profiles. Populus heterophylla L. swamp cottonwood

heterophylla
Trees of the Eastern United States
Trees of the Southeastern United States
Plants described in 1753
Taxa named by Carl Linnaeus